Fortunata "Natuzza" Evolo (23 August 1924 – 1 November 2009) was an Italian Catholic mystic who has been declared a Servant of God. She is said to have evidenced stigmata.

Life
A few months before Natuzza's birth at Paravati near Mileto in Calabria, her father emigrated to Argentina to look for work and the family never saw him again. Maria Angela Valente (Natuzza's mother) took on all sorts of work to feed her numerous family. As soon as she was able to, Natuzza (a diminutive of Fortunata, a common name in Calabria) tried to help her mother and brothers. She was therefore unable to go to school and indeed never learned to read or write.

In 1944 Natuzza's mother married Pasquale Nicolace, a carpenter and they had five children, but from quite an early age she was said to have had visions of Our Lord and Our Lady. There is a 10-volume bibliography on Natuzza by Prof. Valerio Marinelli with many interviews where she explains these facts. The bibliography also has interviews with others who claim to have been healed by her prayers or to have received other graces.

Natuzza became known for the appearance on her body of blood-coloured images and words around the time of Easter and these caused her great psychological and physical pain. Some of the words were found to be Hebrew and Aramaic which was strange because she could not read or write, even in her native Italian. For decades devout Catholics from Calabria, then the rest of Italy and other parts of the world, began coming to her to ask for advice and prayers and to ask her for information about the souls of their relatives.

On 13 May 1987 work began on building a shrine in Paravati dedicated to the Immaculate Heart of Mary, Refuge of Sinners, destined to be her home for the rest of her life and to provide accommodation for the elderly. This is still awaiting authorisation by the Archbishop of Mileto. Italian television crews came several times to interview her and in 1994 she published her autobiography. A documentary film about her was produced in 1987. In 2007 a special programme was broadcast about an entrepreneur from Calabria who had recovered from leukaemia and he interviewed Natuzza.

Fortunata Evolo was admitted to hospital on 29 October 2009 but almost immediately she was released and died of renal failure on the morning of Sunday 1st November at the Immaculate Heart old people's home. The Church bells were ordered by the Parish Priest, Natuzza's spiritual director, to peal out for the Feast of All Saints. Thousands of Catholics came from all over Europe to pay their respects and the cause for her beatification is expected to be started very soon.

Reception

Psychotherapist and skeptic Armando De Vincentiis has published an article claiming that Evolo may have suffered from painful bruising syndrome:

In July 2019, a decree from Luigi Renzo, the bishop of Roman Catholic Diocese of Mileto-Nicotera-Tropea, ordered the suppression of the Immaculate Heart of Mary Refuge of Souls Foundation, which had been founded by Evolo.

References

External links
 Foundation Natuzza Evolo
 Article by parapsychology researcher Michael Nanko
 http://www.prodottitipicicalabria.com/Ipersonaggicalabresi_NatuzzaEvolo

1924 births
2009 deaths
People from Mileto
Stigmatics
Roman Catholic mystics
Marian visionaries
Visions of Jesus and Mary
Italian Servants of God
21st-century venerated Christians